Ernakulam Lok Sabha constituency is one of the 20 Lok Sabha (parliamentary) constituencies in Kerala state in southern india.

It comprises 7 legislative assembly constituencies. The constituency is dominated by Latin Catholics who constitutes half of the population. Eleven of the twelve legislatures were from this community.

Assembly segments

Ernakulam Lok Sabha constituency is composed of the following assembly segments:

Members of Parliament

* indicates bypolls

Votes in Elections

Election Results

2019
According to Election Commission, there are 12,09,44 registered voters in Ernakulam Constituency for 2019 Lok Sabha Election.

2014

See also
 Ernakulam
 List of Constituencies of the Lok Sabha
 Indian general election, 2014 (Kerala)

References

Notes

Citations

External links
 Election Commission of India: https://web.archive.org/web/20081218010942/http://www.eci.gov.in/StatisticalReports/ElectionStatistics.asp
2019 General Election Ernakulam Constituency Live Results 

Lok Sabha constituencies in Kerala
Politics of Ernakulam district